Proto Man, known in Japan as , is a fictional character from Capcom's Mega Man video game series. Proto Man first appeared in the 1990 video game Mega Man 3 as a mini-boss Mega Man had to face periodically, and was known as Break Man (though Proto Man's in-game appearance differs slightly from Break Man's). At the end of Mega Man 3, it is revealed that Break Man's actual name is Proto Man, and that he is Mega Man's older brother. Proto Man made further appearances in many more Mega Man games, sometimes as a playable character, often receiving critical praise.

Concept and creation
Proto Man debuted as a mini-boss in Mega Man 3, and is later revealed to be Mega Man's brother. Character designer Keiji Inafune stated "We wanted people to be  unsure whether Proto Man was a friend or a foe. On one hand, he'd seem like a rival to Mega Man, but at the same time he'd seem like a comrade."

Appearances

Video games
Proto Man is the early prototype of Mega Man that made his first appearance in NES game Mega Man 3 (1990) and is found in the Magnet Man, Hard Man, Shadow Man and Gemini Man levels. He has a grey and red uniform and a yellow scarf. He wears a red helmet with a silvery decoration and a dark visor which hides his eyes. He always appears after his distinctive whistle.

At the end of Mega Man 2: The Power Fighters, it is revealed by Dr. Light that Proto Man's body has a fatal defect in its energy system, and as a result is in great pain and has a more limited lifespan. In Mega Man Powered Up, Proto Man reveals in a dialog with the Yellow Devil that his reactor is already unstable, which due to being a Nuclear reactor, could result in disaster with "one big shock". In the various Mega Man manga, Proto Man has appeared in casual clothing, usually standing atop a building wearing a trenchcoat, sunglasses, slacks, and black shoes. His scarf is tucked into the trenchcoat, but still noticeable.

He can be unlocked as a playable character in Mega Man Powered Up, the PlayStation Portable remake of the first Mega Man game, as well as in Mega Man 9 as part of that game's extra downloadable content in the original release or in the Mega Man Legacy Collection 2 release of Mega Man 9 by either completing the game or by using the secret code at the Mega Man 9 title screen. He is also a playable character in Mega Man 10.

Other appearances
In the Ruby-Spears Mega Man cartoon, Proto Man, having been reprogrammed by Dr. Wily, is villainous and serves as Dr. Wily's main henchman alongside Cut Man and Guts Man in the cartoon series, having similar capabilities as Mega Man and identical to his appearance in the games except the fact that he lacks his shield. He is obsessed with destroying Mega Man and sometimes gets in the way of Wily's plots by going out of his way to do so. 

In Dead Rising 2: Off the Record the player can unlock a Proto Man costume, which can be used by the main character Frank West.

Proto Man also appeared in Mega Mans comics published by Archie Comics.

Another spin-off of the series, Mega Man Battle Network, features ProtoMan.EXE as a friend and rival of the protagonist, MegaMan.EXE. In this series, the characters are computer programs called "NetNavi" rather than robots and exist only in the digital world, although connections to the real world exist and progress through the series. Each person has his or her own NetNavi, and are known as "operators". MegaMan.EXE's operator is Lan, the series protagonist along with MegaMan, while ProtoMan.EXE's operator is Chaud, Lan's rival and a master operator, working with law enforcement.

Proto Man also features as a central character in the works of the band the Protomen, namely in their retelling of the Mega Man series as a dystopian rock opera.

Proto Man makes a cameo in Nova's ending in Ultimate Marvel vs. Capcom 3 as a member of the new "Mega Nova Corps."

In Super Smash Bros. for Nintendo 3DS and Wii U, Proto Man's armor and helmet (through paid DLC) can be worn by Mii fighters. He also appears as a collectible trophy in the Wii U version. In the following game, Super Smash Bros. Ultimate, Proto Man appears alongside Bass in Mega Man's updated Final Smash. On September 4, 2019, it was confirmed on Nintendo's official YouTube Channel that the Proto Man costume for the Mii Fighters would be returning in Ultimate as DLC and was released later that day.

He is a playable character in the fan-made Mega Man 2.5D and Mega Man Maker.

Reception
Proto Man's character was generally received with positive critical response by publications for video games. Complex ranked eight a Proto Man action figure on its list of "The 50 Coolest Video Game Action Figures and Statues". GamesRadar listed him and Mega Man as having one of the best brotherly rivalries in gaming, commenting that he is "quite the anti-hero" and "the cool cat of the two." The same site also said "Everyone loves Mega Man, but some fans prefer the bad boy style of his rival/ally Proto Man", and listed Proto Man as one of the 30 best Capcom characters of the last 30 years, adding "It's hard to say who’s the better robot slayer, but Proto Man’s scarf and shield at least make him the more fashionable of the two." Gavin Jasper of Den of Geek listed him as one of the character missing from the Marvel vs. Capcom series that should have been in, stating "So we've had Mega Man, Mega Man's sister, and now Mega Man’s Reploid brother. Strangely, his rebellious brother has never received his day in the crossover spotlight. Sure, there’s not too much that differentiates him from Mega Man, other than cosmetics and his stationary shield, but Mega Man’s move list is built on stealing weapons and there are so many other Robot Masters to steal from." Ozzie Mejia from Shacknews listed him as one of the characters they wanted to see in the Super Smash Bros. series, adding "Proto Man could utilize an entirely different set of robot master moves, while also using some of his abilities. What separates him from Mega Man is his Proto Buster and his Proto Shield, both of which would fit the Smash Bros setting just fine."

Comic Book Resources writer Daniel Kurland included Proto Man in a list of sidekicks they wish they could play as in a game, listing off Mega Man 3 and saying "DLC for Mega Man 9 gives into temptation and makes Proto Man playable, as well as the PSP remake of the original game, Mega Man: Powered Up, but it’s not the same. A playable Proto Man in Mega Man 3 would have pushed the franchise in a fascinating direction." Reviewing Proto Man's DLC appearance in Mega Man 9, he was praised by Mark Bozon at IGN, who stated "Yes, you're going to have to pay for it, but after going hands-on with Proto Man Mode, and busting up the eight master robots once again, we can tell you that this should be the easiest two bucks you've ever spent. Proto Man is the real deal on Mega Man 9." In a review of Mega Man 10 by Colin Moriarty of IGN Proto Man being playable by default (as opposed to DLC as in Mega Man 9), saying that while they preferred playing as Mega Man, "playing as Proto Man adds more depth to the game, and gives you a reason to play through again once you've beaten Mega Man 10." Tim Turi at Game Informer gave his playable appearance in Mega Man 10 similar praise, noting "His unique attributes require you to rethink how you approach the game, and his vulnerability instills a constant fear of death. Powering through Mega Man 10 with Proto Man is as harrowing as it is rewarding."

The absence of Proto Man in Mega Man 11 has been criticized. Mega Man 11 producer explained his exclusion in the game, where it is stated "What we struggled with the most was how to develop a clear and engaging story that builds upon the previous installments while appealing to a wide range of players; new players picking up a Mega Man game for the first time, those who may have forgotten the series' backstory, and the hardcore fans who remember the events of 9 and 10 as though they happened yesterday. After the long gap between 10 and 11, we decided to focus on sharing an untold story that touches on the past of Dr. Light and Dr. Wily."

References

External links 
 

Male characters in video games
Mega Man characters
Robot characters in video games
Robot superheroes
Video game characters introduced in 1990
Video game characters who can teleport
Video game bosses
Video game sidekicks
Video game superheroes

ja:ロックマンシリーズ#ロボット